

1997

See also 
 1997 in Australia
 1997 in Australian television
List of 1997 box office number-one films in Australia

References

External links 
 Australian film at the Internet Movie Database

1997
Australia
Films